The Goodwin Games is an American sitcom series that aired as a midseason replacement on Fox from May 20 to July 1, 2013. It was created and written by Carter Bays and Craig Thomas (creators of How I Met Your Mother) alongside Chris Harris.

Premise
The series revolves around a trio of estranged siblings: Henry, an overachieving surgeon with an overabundant ego; Chloe, a former child mathematical prodigy who became popular in high school and abandoned academia (and her friends) for a career as a struggling actress; and Jimmy, a career petty criminal with a string of convictions who has to sneak into his pre-teen daughter's bedroom at night to visit her.  The siblings return home for their father's funeral.  His attorney (one of Chloe's abandoned childhood friends) April Cho informs them that their father's will awards them $23 million, but only if they agree to compete in a series of games of their father's devising.  The games are designed to force them to confront their personal failings, recall their childhoods, and bring them together as a family once again.  When the siblings resist, April informs them that their father anticipated their reaction, and therefore a fourth individual will be involved in the games, a complete stranger named Elijah, who collects part of the remaining inheritance every time the siblings fail to follow their father's instructions.

Cast

Main cast
 Becki Newton as Chloe Goodwin
 Scott Foley as Henry Goodwin
 T. J. Miller as Jimmy Goodwin (Jake Lacy in the original pilot)
 Kat Foster as Lucinda Hobbes 
(Felisha Terrell in the original pilot)
 Melissa Tang as April Cho

Recurring
 Sabrina Carpenter as Young Chloe Goodwin 
 Beau Bridges as Benjamin Goodwin
 Kaitlyn Maher as Piper Goodwin
 Jerrod Carmichael as Elijah
 Stefanie Black as Annie
 Laurie Metcalf as Dr. Richland
 Adam Rodriguez as Ivan
 Janina Gavankar as Hannah
 Chris Diamantopoulos as Chad
 William Edward Dagsher as Fisherman

Production
On May 9, 2012, Fox placed a series order for the comedy  that was expected to premiere during the 2012–13 television season as a mid-season entry. On June 7, 2012, it was announced that T. J. Miller was replacing Jake Lacy in the role of Jimmy.  On November 2, 2012, it was announced that Fox cut the episode order from thirteen to seven.

Episodes

Broadcast
The series premiered in Australia on Eleven on May 20, 2014.

Reception 
On Rotten Tomatoes, the series has an aggregate score of 38% based on 6 positive and 10 negative critic reviews.  The website consensus reads: "The Goodwin Games is simply unimpressive in the most uninteresting ways." On Metacritic, the series has a score of 57 out of 100 based on 17 critic reviews, indicating "Mixed to Average"

References

External links

2010s American single-camera sitcoms
2013 American television series debuts
2013 American television series endings
English-language television shows
Television shows set in New Hampshire
Fox Broadcasting Company original programming
Fictional games
Television series by 20th Century Fox Television
Television shows directed by Peyton Reed